Samuele Maurizi (born 8 September 1995) is an Italian football player. He plays for Serie D club Montespaccato.

Club career
He made his Serie C debut for Fermana on 10 September 2017 in a game against Südtirol.

On 29 January 2021, he moved to Pistoiese.

On 2 July 2021, he joined Serie D club Montespaccato.

References

External links
 

1995 births
Footballers from Rome
Living people
Italian footballers
A.C. Carpi players
Fermana F.C. players
U.S. Pistoiese 1921 players
Serie D players
Serie C players
Association football forwards